Katharina Thalbach (actually Katharina Joachim genannt Thalbach; born 19 January 1954) is a German actress and stage director. She played theatre at the Berliner Ensemble and at the Volksbühne Berlin, and was actress in the film The Tin Drum. She worked as a theatre and opera director.

Life and work 
Born in East Berlin, Katharina Thalbach's father Benno Besson was a director, her mother Sabine Thalbach, was an actress. Also actors are her half-brother  and her stepmother Ursula Karusseit.

At the age of four, Thalbach was playing children's roles on stage, on television and in films. After the death of her mother in 1966, Helene Weigel took her under her care. In 1967, she made her debut as the whore Betty (later the Polly) in Erich Engel's production of Brecht's Dreigroschenoper. She completed her Abitur at the Max-Planck-Oberschule. She obtained her stage maturity examination as a master student of Helene Weigel, Berliner Ensemble. Thalbach played at the Berliner Ensemble and at the Volksbühne Berlin, where her father worked as artistic director.

In 1976, Thalbach moved with her partner Thomas Brasch to West Germany, because he was protesting against Wolf Biermann's expatriation. In West Berlin, she made her debut at the Schillertheater. She acted as a guest star in Hans Lietzau's production of Hauptmann's Der Biberpelz and in Jürgen Flimm's production of Kleist's Das Käthchen von Heilbronn, for which she was voted actress of the year by Theater heute in 1980. She had success with the role of Maria in Volker Schlöndorff's 1979 film adaptation of Grass' The Tin Drum. In 1984, she performed the Ophelia in Shakespeare's Hamlet in Zürich.

Since 1987, she worked as a director. Her break through was the award-winning production Macbeth. Since 1997, she was opera director, with productions of Mozart's Don Giovanni and Janáček's The Cunning Little Vixen in Berlin.

Personal life
Thalbach's partner Thomas Brasch was an author. She is married to Uwe Hamacher. She lives in Berlin.

Awards 
Source:

 1973 Critics' Prize of the Berliner Zeitung, GDR
 1973 Actress of the Year, Theater heute
 1978 Bavarian Film Award for best young actress
 1980 German Actors' Award from the Federal Directors' Association
 1980 Actress of the Year, Theater heute
 1983 IFF Actor Award for Domino
 1987 German Film Award: Filmband in Gold (Best Actress)
 1991 Konrad Wolf Prize, Academy of Arts
 1992 Critics' Award (Barcelona): Best Foreign Production for Macbeth
 1996 Carl Zuckmayer Medal
 1997 Adolf Grimme Prize for Dangerous Girlfriend
 2007 Bavarian Film Award, as best actress for Strike
 2007 Order of Merit of Berlin
 2009 Golden Curtain of the Berliner Theaterclub e.V. for As you like it
 2011 Golden Curtain of the Berliner Theaterclub e.V. for The Abduction of the Sabine Women
 2012 Star on the 
 2012 German Actors Award (Honorary Award for Lifetime Achievement)
 2013 Audio Book Prize of the City of Wiesbaden for Der Bärbeiß
 2013 German Academy for Television for Best Supporting Role (The Minister)
 2014 German Audiobook Prize (special prize for her life's work)
 2015 
 2015 Officer's Cross of the Order of Merit of the Federal Republic of Germany
 2015 German Comedy Award for Best Actress
 2019 Officer of the Ordre des Arts et des Lettres
 2020

Memberships
 1995 Member of the Freie Akademie der Künste Hamburg
 1999 Member of the Academy of Arts, Berlin
 2003 Founding member of the Deutsche Filmakademie (German Film Academy)
 Member of the Deutsche Akademie der Darstellenden Künste

Filmography 
Source:

 Johannes Kepler (1974)
 The Blue Light (1976)
 It is an Old Story
 Schlaraffenland
 Lotte in Weimar
  (1976)
 The Second Awakening of Christa Klages (1978)
 Winterspelt (1978)
 The Tin Drum (1979)
  (1979, TV miniseries)
  (1980, TV film)
 Angels of Iron (1981)
  (1982)
 Sophie's Choice (1982)
 Embers (1983)
 Peaceful Days (1984)
  (1986)
 Flight North (1986)
 Väter und Söhne – Eine deutsche Tragödie (1986, TV miniseries)
  (1988)
 The Passenger – Welcome to Germany (1988)
 Follow Me (1989)
 Good Evening, Mr. Wallenberg (1990)
  (1990)
 Just a Matter of Duty (1993)
  (1994)
 Back to Square One (1994)
 Silent Night (1995)
 Gefährliche Freundin (1996, TV film)
 Caipiranha (1999)
 Sonnenallee (1999)
 Liebesau – the other Home (2001, TV miniseries)
 Die Manns – Ein Jahrhundertroman (2001, TV miniseries)
  (2005, TV film)
 The Robber Hotzenplotz (2006)
  (2006, TV film)
 Strike (2006)
 Deadline – Jede Sekunde zählt (2007, TV series)
  (2007)
 Mrs. Ratcliffe's Revolution (directed by Bille Eltringham, 2007)
 You Are Not Alone (2007)
 The Moon and Other Lovers (2008)
 Ruby Red (2013)
  (2013, TV film)
 Der Tote im Pub (2013, TV-adaptation of The Man With A Load Of Mischief from the Richard Jury mystery series by Martha Grimes) 
 Mord im Nebel (2015, TV-adaptation of Help the poor Struggler from the Richard Jury mystery series by Martha Grimes) 
  (2016, TV film)
 Inspektor Jury spielt Katz und Maus (2017, TV-adaptation of The Deer Leap from the Richard Jury mystery series by Martha Grimes)
  (2018)
 Der faule Engel (2019) (p. Addi)
  (2019)

Theatre and Opera

Actress
Source:

 Polly in Dreigroschenoper at the Berliner Ensemble 1969
 Venus/Galatea in Die schöne Helena (ed. Peter Hacks Volksbühne) 1972
 Lovely Rita Schillertheater 1978
 Der Hauptmann von Köpenick
 Das Käthchen von Heilbronn (Schauspiel Köln) 1980
 Mutter Courage und ihre Kinder (1995)
 Frau Jenny Treibel in Frau Jenny Treibel (Hans Otto Theater Potsdam) 2005
 Tante Augusta in Ernst und seine tiefere Bedeutung (Komödie am Kurfürstendamm) 2006 (also stage director)
 Emanuel Striese und Luise Striese in Der Raub der Sabinerinnen (The Abduction of the Sabine Women) (Hans Otto Theater Potsdam) 2006 (also stage director)

Director
Source:

 Macbeth (Schiller Theater Berlin)
 Mann ist Mann and Dreigroschenoper (Thalia Theater Hamburg)
 Der Hauptmann von Köpenick and Romeo und Julia (Maxim Gorki Theater)
 Das schlaue Füchslein and Der Barbier von Sevilla (Deutsche Oper Berlin)
 Don Giovanni (E-Werk Berlin)
 Salome, Aufstieg und Fall der Stadt Mahagonny, Rigoletto (Oper Köln)
 Hänsel und Gretel and Aida (Semperoper Dresden)
 Die Fledermaus (Theater Erfurt)
 Fidelio (Oper Zürich)
 Im Dickicht der Städte (Berliner Ensemble)
 Die Zauberflöte
 The Resistible Rise of Arturo Ui (Comédie-Française Paris)
 Wie es euch gefällt (Komödie am Kurfürstendamm)

References

External links 
 

1954 births
Living people
People from East Berlin
Actresses from Berlin
German stage actresses
German theatre directors
German opera directors
Best Actress German Film Award winners
German film actresses
German television actresses
20th-century German actresses
21st-century German actresses
Members of the Academy of Arts, Berlin
Officers Crosses of the Order of Merit of the Federal Republic of Germany
Recipients of the Order of Merit of Berlin